Vito Carrera (born  in Trapani, active 1603 - died Palermo, 1623) was an Italian painter of the Baroque period, active mainly in Palermo. Also known as il Trapanese, since he was born in Trapani. Among his pupils were Pietro Novelli and Andrea Carreca. In Trapani, he painted for the church of the Dominicani, and the organ doors for the church of Santa Maria di Gesu.

References

1631 deaths
17th-century Italian painters
Italian male painters
Painters from Palermo
Italian Baroque painters
1603 births
People from Trapani